Rigaud, Pons & Compagnie was a bookselling firm in Montpellier, France, in the 18th century.

Titles published by the firm

See also
 Books in France

References

French booksellers
Organizations based in Montpellier